Tu Kahe Agar is an Indian television series that aired on Zee TV based on an astrological prediction that can greatly affect human life. The series premiered on 1 April 2002, and stars Rohit Bakshi and Shraddha Nigam in the main lead. It used to air every Monday to Thursday at 10:30pm. It ended on 15 August 2002.

Cast
 Rohit Bakshi as Vishal
 Shraddha Nigam as Maya
 Vineeta Malik as Maya's grandmother
 Malavika Shivpuri
 Pankit Thakker as Karan
 Prachi Thakker
 Yatin Karyekar as Maya's father
 Arun Bali
 Kulbhushan Kharbanda as Vishal's Tauji
 Daya Shankar Pandey
 Arya Rawal

References

Zee TV original programming
Indian drama television series
Indian television soap operas
2002 Indian television series debuts